Cornelia Lake Bridge is a historic structure located northeast of Clarion, Iowa, United States.  The bridge was originally constructed over the Iowa River in 1877.  It was built by A.S. Leonard by using steel supplied by the Wrought Iron Bridge Company.  It was named the Berry Bridge after local landowner James Berry for most of its existence.  It was replaced by a new span in 1986 and the main span of this bridge was moved to Cornelia Lake
Park where it serves as a pedestrian bridge over a small inlet.  It was listed on the National Register of Historic Places in 1998.

References

Bridges completed in 1877
Transportation buildings and structures in Wright County, Iowa
Road bridges on the National Register of Historic Places in Iowa
Truss bridges in Iowa
National Register of Historic Places in Wright County, Iowa
Steel bridges in the United States
1877 establishments in Iowa